AD 92 (XCII) was a leap year starting on Sunday (link will display the full calendar) of the Julian calendar. At the time, it was known as the Year of the Consulship of Augustus and Saturninus (or, less frequently, year 845 Ab urbe condita). The denomination AD 92 for this year has been used since the early medieval period, when the Anno Domini calendar era became the prevalent method in Europe for naming years.

Events

By place

Roman Empire 
 Emperor Domitian becomes a Roman Consul.
 In spring, several tribes (probably Marcomanni, Quadi, Jazyges) cross the Danube and attack Pannonia, probably destroying Legio XXI Rapax. These tribes are defeated from May to December 92, and chased back over the river. The Romans do not pursue the retreating tribes.
 The Roman army moves into Mesopotamia (modern Syria).
 The Flavian Palace is completed on the Palatine.

Births 
 Pope Anicetus

Deaths 
 April 9 – Yuan An, Chinese administrator, scholar and statesman
 Antipas of Pergamum, Roman bishop, martyr
 Ban Gu, Chinese historian, poet and writer (b. AD 32)
 Dou Xian, Chinese general and statesman of the Eastern Han Dynasty
 Gaius Julius Archelaus Antiochus Epiphanes, prince of Commagene (b. AD 38)

References 

0092